Dayalan Hemalatha (born 29 September 1994) is an Indian cricketer. She is a right-handed batter and bowls right-arm off-break. She plays domestic cricket for Railways, and has previously played for Tamil Nadu and South Zone. 

In March 2018, she was named in India Women's Women's One Day International (WODI) squad for their series against England Women, but she did not play. She made her WODI debut against Sri Lanka on 11 September 2018.

In October 2018, she was named in India's squad for the 2018 ICC Women's World Twenty20 tournament in the West Indies. She made her Women's Twenty20 International (WT20I) debut against New Zealand on 9 November 2018.

References

External links 
 
 

1994 births
Living people
Cricketers from Chennai
Sportswomen from Tamil Nadu
India women One Day International cricketers
India women Twenty20 International cricketers
Tamil Nadu women cricketers
Railways women cricketers
South Zone women cricketers
IPL Trailblazers cricketers
Gujarat Giants (WPL) cricketers